This article is about Italian military operations in World War I. 

Although a member of the Triple Alliance, Italy did not join the Central Powers – Germany and Austria-Hungary – when the war started with Austria-Hungary's declaration of war on Serbia on 28 July 1914. In fact, the two Central Powers had taken the offensive while the Triple Alliance was supposed to be a defensive alliance. Moreover the Triple Alliance recognized that both Italy and Austria-Hungary were interested in the Balkans and required both to consult each other before changing the status quo and to provide compensation for whatever advantage in that area: Austria-Hungary did consult Germany but not Italy before issuing the ultimatum to Serbia, and refused any compensation before the end of the war.

Almost a year after the war's commencement, after secret parallel negotiations with both sides (with the Allies in which Italy negotiated for territory if victorious, and with the Central Powers to gain territory if neutral) Italy entered the war on the side of the Allied Powers. Italy began to fight against Austria-Hungary along the northern border, including high up in the now-Italian Alps with very cold winters and along the Isonzo river. The Italian army repeatedly attacked and, despite winning a majority of the battles, suffered heavy losses and made little progress as the mountainous terrain favoured the defender. Italy was then forced to retreat in 1917 by a German-Austrian counteroffensive at the Battle of Caporetto after Russia left the war, allowing the Central Powers to move reinforcements to the Italian Front from the Eastern Front.

The offensive of the Central Powers was stopped by Italy at the Battle of Monte Grappa in November 1917 and the Battle of the Piave River in May 1918. Italy took part in the Second Battle of the Marne and the subsequent Hundred Days Offensive in the Western Front. On 24 October 1918 the Italians, despite being outnumbered, breached the Austrian line in Vittorio Veneto and caused the collapse of the centuries-old Habsburg Empire. Italy recovered the territory lost after the fighting at Caporetto in November the previous year and moved into Trento and South Tyrol. Fighting ended on 4 November 1918. Italian armed forces were also involved in the African theatre, the Balkan theatre, the Middle Eastern theatre and then took part in the Occupation of Constantinople. At the end of World War I, Italy was recognized with a permanent seat in the League of Nations' executive council along with Britain, France and Japan.

Roy Pryce summarized the bitter experience:

The government's hope was that the war would be the culmination of Italy's struggle for national independence. Her new allies promised her the "natural frontiers" which she had so long sought-the Trentino and Trieste-and something more. At the end of hostilities she did indeed extend her territory, but she came away from the peace conference dissatisfied with her reward for three and a half years' bitter warfare, having lost half a million of her noblest youth, with her economy impoverished and internal divisions more bitter than ever. That strife could not be resolved within the framework of the old parliamentary regime. The war that was to have been the climax of the Risorgimento produced the Fascist dictatorship. Something, somewhere, had gone wrong.

From neutrality to intervention

Italy was a member of the Triple Alliance with Germany and Austria-Hungary. Despite this, in the years before the war, Italy had enhanced its diplomatic relationships with the United Kingdom and France. This was because the Italian government had grown convinced that support of Austria (the traditional enemy of Italy during the 19th century Risorgimento) would not gain Italy the territories it wanted: Trieste, Istria, Zara and Dalmatia, all Austrian possessions. In fact, a secret agreement signed with France in 1902 sharply conflicted with Italy's membership in the Triple Alliance.

A few days after the outbreak of the war, on 3 August 1914, the government, led by the conservative Antonio Salandra, declared that Italy would not commit its troops, maintaining that the Triple Alliance had only a defensive stance and Austria-Hungary had been the aggressor. Thereafter Salandra and the minister of Foreign Affairs, Sidney Sonnino, began to probe which side would grant the best reward for Italy's entrance in the war or its neutrality. Although the majority of the cabinet (including former Prime Minister Giovanni Giolitti) was firmly against intervention, numerous intellectuals, including Socialists such as Ivanoe Bonomi, Leonida Bissolati, and, after 18 October 1914, Benito Mussolini, declared in favour of intervention, which was then mostly supported by the Nationalist and the Liberal parties. Pro-interventionist socialists believed that, once that weapons had been distributed to the people, they could have transformed the war into a revolution.

The negotiation with Central Powers to keep Italy neutral failed: after victory Italy was to get Trentino but not the South Tyrol, part of the Austrian Littoral but not Trieste, maybe Tunisia but only after the end of the war while Italy wanted them immediately. The negotiation with the Allies led to the London Pact (26 April 1915), signed by Sonnino without the approval of the Italian Parliament. According to the Pact, after victory Italy was to get Trentino and the South Tyrol up to the Brenner Pass, the entire Austrian Littoral (with Trieste), Gorizia and Gradisca (Eastern Friuli) and Istria (but without Fiume), parts of western Carniola (Idrija and Ilirska Bistrica) and north-western Dalmatia with Zara and most of the islands, but without Split. Other agreements concerned the sovereignty of the port of Valona, the province of Antalya in Turkey and part of the German colonies in Africa.

On 3 May 1915 Italy officially revoked the Triple Alliance. In the following days Giolitti and the neutralist majority of the Parliament opposed declaring war, while nationalist crowds demonstrated in public areas for it. (The nationalist poet Gabriele D'Annunzio called this period le radiose giornate di Maggio—"the sunny days of May"). Giolitti had the support of the majority of Italian parliament so on 13 May Salandra offered his resignation to King Victor Emmanuel III, but then Giolitti learned that the London Pact was already signed: fearful of a conflict between the Crown and the Parliament and the consequences on both internal stability and foreign relationships, Giolitti accepted the fait accompli, declined to succeed as prime minister and Salandra's resignation was not accepted. On 23 May, Italy declared war on Austria-Hungary. This was followed by declarations of war on the Ottoman Empire (21 August 1915, following an ultimatum of 3 August), Bulgaria (19 October 1915) and the German Empire (28 August 1916).

Italian Front

Italian forces were numerically superior but this advantage was negated by the difficult terrain. Further, the Italians lacked strategic and tactical leadership. The Italian commander-in-chief was Luigi Cadorna, a staunch proponent of the frontal assault whose tactics cost the lives of hundreds of thousands of Italian soldiers. His plan was to attack on the Isonzo front, with the dream of breaking over the Karst Plateau into the Carniolan Basin, taking Ljubljana and threatening the Austro-Hungarian Empire's capital Vienna. It was a Napoleonic plan, which had no realistic chance of success in an age of barbed wire, machine guns, and indirect artillery fire, combined with hilly and mountainous terrain.

The first shells were fired in the dawn of 24 May 1915 against the enemy positions of Cervignano del Friuli, which was captured a few hours later. On the same day the Austro-Hungarian fleet bombarded the railway stations of Manfredonia and Ancona. The first Italian casualty was Riccardo Di Giusto.

The main effort was to be concentrated in the Isonzo and Vipava valleys and on the Karst Plateau, in the direction of Ljubljana. The Italian troops had some initial successes, but as in the Western Front, the campaign soon evolved into trench warfare.

In the first months of the war Italy launched the following offensives:
 First Battle of the Isonzo (23 June – 7 July)
 Second Battle of the Isonzo (18 July – 4 August)
 Third Battle of the Isonzo (18 October – 4 November)
 Fourth Battle of the Isonzo (10 November)

In these first four battles, the Italian Army registered 60,000 fatalities and more than 150,000 wounded, equivalent to around one fourth of the mobilized forces. The offensive in the upper Cadore, near the Col di Lana, though secondary, blocked large Austro-Hungarian contingents, since it menaced their main logistic lines in Tyrol.

Italian offensives of 1916–1917

This stalemate dragged on for the whole of 1916. While the Austro-Hungarians amassed large forces in Trentino, the Italian command launched the Fifth Battle of the Isonzo, lasting for eight days from 11 March 1916. This attempt was also fruitless.

In June the Austro-Hungarian counter-offensive (dubbed "Strafexpedition", "Punishment Expedition") broke through in Trentino and occupied the whole Altopiano di Asiago. The Italian Army managed however to contain the offensive and the enemy retreated in order to strengthen its position in the Carso. On 4 August began the Sixth Battle of the Isonzo which, five days later, led to the Italian conquest of Gorizia, at the cost of 20,000 dead and 50,000 wounded. The year ended with three new offensives:

Seventh Battle of the Isonzo (14–16 September)
Eighth Battle of the Isonzo (1 November)
Ninth Battle of the Isonzo (4 November)

The price was a further 37,000 dead and 88,000 wounded for the Italians, again for no remarkable conquest. In late 1916, the Italian army advanced for some kilometers in Trentino, while, for the whole winter of 1916–1917, the situation in the Isonzo front remained stationary. In May and June was the Tenth Battle of the Isonzo. The Battle of Mount Ortigara (10–25 June) was Cadorna's attempt to conquer back some territories in Trentino which had remained under Austro-Hungarian control. On 18 August 1917 began the most important Italian offensive, the Eleventh Battle of the Isonzo.  This time the Italian advance was initially successful as the Bainsizza Plateau southeast of Tolmino was captured, but the Italian army outran its artillery and supply lines, thus preventing the further advance that could have finally succeeded in breaking the Austro-Hungarian army. The Austro-Hungarian line ultimately held and the attack was abandoned on 12 September 1917.

Austro-Hungarian offensives of 1917–1918

Though the last Italian offensive had proven inconclusive, the  Austro-Hungarians were in strong need of reinforcements. These became available when Russia crumbled and troops from the Eastern front, the Trentino front and Flanders were secretly concentrated on the Isonzo front.

On 24 October 1917, the Central Powers troops broke through the Italian lines in the upper Isonzo at Caporetto (the modern Kobarid) and routed the 2nd Italian Army. The Italian army commanders had been informed of a probable enemy attack, but had underestimated it and did not realize the danger posed by the infiltration tactics developed by Germans.

The defeat of Caporetto caused the disintegration of the whole Italian front of the Isonzo. The situation was re-established by forming a stop line on the Tagliamento and then on the Piave rivers, but at the price of 10,000 dead, 30,000 wounded, 265,000 prisoners, 300,000 stragglers, 50,000 deserters, over 3,000 artillery pieces, 3,000 machine guns and 1,700 mortars. The  Austro-Hungarian and German losses totaled 70,000. Cadorna, who had tried to attribute the causes of the disasters to low morale and cowardice among the troops, was relieved of duty. On 8 November 1917 he was replaced by Armando Diaz.

The Central Powers ended the year 1917 with a general offensive on the Piave, the Altopiano di Asiago, and the Monte Grappa, which failed and the Italian front reverted to attritional trench warfare. The Italian army was forced to call the 1899 levy, while that of 1900 was left for a hypothetical final effort for the year of 1919.

The Central Powers stopped their attacks in 1917 because German troops were needed on the Western Front while the Austro-Hungarian troops were exhausted and at the end of much longer logistical lines. The offensive was renewed on 15 June 1918 with Austro-Hungarian troops only in the Battle of Piave. The Italians resisted the assault. The failure of the offensive marked the swan song of Austria-Hungary on the Italian front. The Central Powers proved finally unable to sustain further the war effort, while the multi-ethnic entities of the  Austro-Hungarian Empire were on the verge of rebellion. The Italians rescheduled earlier their planned 1919 counter-offensive to October 1918, in order to take advantage of the Austro-Hungarian crisis.

Italian victory

The Italian attack of 52 Italian divisions, aided by 3 British 2 French and 1 American division, 65,000 total and Czechoslovaks (see British and French forces in Italy during World War I), was started on 24 October from Vittorio Veneto. The Austro-Hungarians fought tenaciously for four days, but then the Italians managed to cross the Piave and establish a bridgehead, the Austro-Hungarians began to retreat and then disintegrate after the troops heard of revolutions and independence proclamations in the lands of the Dual Monarchy. Austria-Hungary asked for an armistice on 29 October. The armistice was signed on 3 November at Villa Giusti, near Padua. Italian soldiers entered Trento while Bersaglieri landed from the sea in Trieste. The following day the Istrian cities of Rovigno and Parenzo, the Dalmatian island of Lissa, and the Dalmatian cities of Zara and Fiume were occupied: the latter were not included in the territories originally promised secretly by the Allies to Italy in case of victory, but the Italians decided to intervene in reply to a local National Council, formed after the flight of the Hungarians, and which had announced the union to the Kingdom of Italy. The Regia Marina occupied Pola and Sebenico, which became the capital of the Military Government of Dalmatia. It occupied also all Tyrol by the III Corps of the First Army with 20–22,000 soldiers.

Other theaters

Balkans

Italian troops played a major role in the defence of Albania against Austria-Hungary. From 1916 the Italian 35th Division fought on the Salonika front as part of the Allied Army of the Orient. The Italian XVI Corps (a separate entity independent from the Army of the Orient) took part in actions against Austro-Hungarian forces in Albania; in 1917 they established an Italian protectorate over Albania.

Western Front

Some Italian divisions were also sent to support the Entente on the Western Front. In 1918 Italian troops saw intense combat during the German spring offensive. Their most prominent engagement on this front was their role in the Second Battle of the Marne.

Middle East

Italy played a token role in the Sinai and Palestine Campaign, sending a detachment of five hundred soldiers to assist the British there in 1917.

As Italy entered the war on 23 May 1915, the situation of her forces in the African colonies was critical. Italian Somaliland, in the east was far from being pacified, and in North Africa's Cyrenaica the Italian forces were confined to some separated points on the coast. But in neighboring Tripolitania and Fezzan, the story has a different beginning. In August 1914, during their previous colonial invasion and occupation versus local military and forces of the Ottoman Empire, the Italian forces reached Ghat, that is, conquered most of western Libya. But in November 1914, this advance turned into a general retreat, and on 7 April and 28 April, they suffered two reverses at Wadi Marsit (near Mizda) and Gasr Bu Hadi (or al-Qurdabiya near Sirte) respectively. By August 1915, the situation in Tripolitania was similar to that of Cyrenaica. The conquest of all of Libya was not resumed until January 1922.

Consequences

Italy's representative at the Paris Peace Conference, which led to the Versailles Treaty, was Premier Vittorio Emanuele Orlando. Orlando was considered one of the "Big Four" with Premier Georges Clemenceau of the French Republic, President Woodrow Wilson of the United States, and Prime Minister David Lloyd George of the United Kingdom. Italy received a bit of the land promised in The Treaty of London but not northern Dalmatia nor Fiume. The expectation to gain part of German colonies conquered by the Allies was also not realized. After long discussions the Italian diplomats left the Conference in protest but were forced to rejoin after the Allies refused to concede to all Italian demands and just went on.  The territorial gains were perceived as small in comparison to the cost of the war for Italy. The debt contracted to pay for the war's expenses was finally paid back only in the 1970s. The uncertain socio-economic situation and the broken promises from Allied powers caused heavy social strife which led to the Biennio rosso and later the rise of Fascism and its leader Benito Mussolini.

See also
Propaganda and censorship in Italy during the First World War
Italian prisoners of war in the First World War

References

Further reading
 Ferrari, Paolo. "The Memory And Historiography Of The First World War In Italy" Comillas Journal of International Relations (2015) #2 pp 117–126  [ISSN 2386-5776] DOI: cir.i02.y2015.009  online
 Gooch, G. P. Recent Revelations Of European Diplomacy (1940), pp 245–62 summarizes memoirs of major participants
 
 
 Pergher, Roberta. "An Italian War? War and Nation in the Italian Historiography of the First World War" Journal of Modern History (Dec 2018)  90#4
 Pryce, Roy.  "Italy and the Outbreak of the First World War." Cambridge Historical Journal 11#2 (1954): 219-27 online.

External links
 Italy World War
Cappellano, Filippo: Warfare 1914–1918 (Italy) , in: 1914-1918-online. International Encyclopedia of the First World War.

 
World War I, Military

Italy
World War I
Military, WW I